Schloss Hartheim, also known as Hartheim Castle, is a castle at Alkoven in Upper Austria, some  from Linz, Austria. It was built by Jakob von Aspen in 1600, and it is a prominent Renaissance castle in the country. The building became notorious as one of the centers for the Nazi killing program known as Action T4, in which German citizens deemed mentally or physically unfit were systematically killed with poison gas. After the end of Action T4 (August 1941), these killings were extended to include Jews, Communists and others considered undesirable by the state who were imprisoned in concentration camps. These people stem from various countries in the world. In this capacity it was known as the Hartheim Killing Facility. In sum 30.000 people  (18.000 people with handicaps and mentally ill people, about 12.000 concentrations camp prisoners and forced laborers) were killed in Hartheim until the end of the year 1944.
 
In 1898, Prince Camillo Heinrich Starhemberg (1835–1900) donated the castle as a gift to the Upper Austria Charity Organization. With the help of additional donations, they used the castle from the beginning of the 20th century as a psychiatric institution (German: Psychiatrische Anstalt, but originally called the Idioten-Anstalt).

History to 1940 

Hartheim lies in the middle of the so-called Eferding Basin, that runs along the River Danube from Ottensheim to Aschach an der Donau. As early as 1130, a family with the name Hartheim is mentioned in the records. They were vassals of the bishops of Passau. In 1287, three brothers, Conrad, Peter and Henry of Hartheim, were named as owners of the castle as part of a barter arrangement with the Wilhering Abbey. In any case by 1323, another family was named as the owners. Until the middle of the 14th century the site consisted mainly of just one tower, subsequently a residence was added and it was surrounded by a small wall with ramparts and ditches.

After changing hands several times the castle ended up in the possession of the Aspen family, who probably built the castle into its present shape. At the beginning of the 1690s they had a completely new castle built conforming to perceptions of the ideal Renaissance style with a regular four-winged building with four polygonal corner towers and a higher central tower.

In 1799, George Adam, Prince of Starhemberg, purchased the castle. However, by 1862 the castle was in a rather poor condition, as a contemporary report describes: "Doors, windows and ovens are entirely missing, ... and several ceilings must be replaced."

In 1898, Camillo Henry, Prince of Starhemberg, made a present of the castle building, the outbuildings and some land to the Upper Austrian State Welfare Society (Oberösterreichischen Landeswohltätigkeitsverein or OÖ. LWV). It was intended to use further donation to convert the building into an "Idiot's Institute" as it was described at the time. In addition between 1900 and 1910 major renovation and conversion work was carried out to enable the building to be used as a care home for mentally handicapped people. In 1926, a staircase was dismantled and replaced by a bed lift.

Nazi era and aftermath 

Following Hitler's so-called "euthanasia decree" of 1939, Hartheim  was selected as one of six killing facilities in the Reich. Between May 1940 and December 1944, approximately 30,000 people physically and mentally disabled or ill were killed at Schloss Hartheim by gassing with Carbon monoxide as part of Action T4, a program of mass murder named after the Berlin address "Tiergartenstrasse 4". These included about twelve thousand prisoners from the Dachau and Mauthausen concentration camps who were sent here to be gassed, as were hundreds of women sent from Ravensbrück concentration camp in 1944, predominantly sufferers of TB and those deemed mentally infirm . The castle was regularly visited by the psychiatrists Karl Brandt, Professor of Psychiatry at Würzburg University, and Werner Heyde. In December 1944 Schloss Hartheim was closed as an extermination centre and restored as a sanatorium after being cleared of evidence of the crimes committed therein.

In 1946, Alice Ricciardi-von Platen, a psychiatrist and psychoanalyst who practised near Linz, Austria, was invited to join the German team observing the so-called Doctors' trial in Nuremberg. The trial was presided over by American judges, who indicted Karl Brandt and 22 others. The 16 who were convicted included Josef Mengele; seven were sentenced to death. Her 1948 book, Die Tötung Geisteskranker in Deutschland, ("The killing of the mentally ill in Germany"), was judged a scandal by German medical professionals.

After World War II, the building was converted into apartments. 1969, the first memorial rooms were opened in the former gas chamber and admission room. Since 2003 Hartheim Castle is a memorial site dedicated to the ten thousands of physically and mentally handicapped persons, concentration camp prisoners and forced laborers who were murdered there by the Nazis. Also in 2003 the exhibition "Value of Life" was opened.

See also 
 Action T4
 Action 14f13

Further reading 
 Angela Gluck Wood, Holocaust - the events and their impact on real people Foreword by Steven Spielberg. Many photos. DK Publishing (2007)

Sources 
 Pierre Serge Choumoff, Les Assassinats Nationaux-Socialistes par Gaz en Territoire Autrichien, Vienna, Bundesministerium für Inneres, 2000, 
 Nazi Medicine and the Nuremberg Trials (PDF) Table of contents, introduction and index only.
 Eutanasia, le radici dello sterminio

References

External links 
 Hartheim Castle official site

Castles in Upper Austria
Museums in Upper Austria
History museums in Austria
World War II museums
Monuments and memorials in Austria
Museums established in 2003
Palaces in Austria
Tourist attractions in Upper Austria